The Europe Zone was one of the four zones within Group 3 of the regional Davis Cup competition in 2016. The zone's competition was held in round robin format in Tallinn, Estonia, in March 2016. Estonia and Cyprus won promotion to Group II, Europe/Africa Zone, for 2017.

Participating nations

Inactive nations

Draw
Date: 2–5 March 2016

Location: Tere Tennis Centre, Tallinn, Estonia (indoor hard)

Format: Round-robin basis. Four pools of four teams (Pools A, B, C and D). The winners of each pool play-off against each other to determine which two nations are promoted to Europe/Africa Zone Group II in 2017.

Seeding: The seeding was based on the Davis Cup Rankings of 30 November 2015 (shown in parentheses below).

Groups:

Group A

Group B

Group C

Group D

First round

Group A

Moldova vs. San Marino

Malta vs. San Marino

Moldova vs. Malta

Group B

Ireland vs. Albania

Macedonia vs. Armenia

Ireland vs. Armenia

Macedonia vs. Albania

Ireland vs. Macedonia

Armenia vs. Albania

Group C

Cyprus vs. Iceland

Montenegro vs. Andorra

Montenegro vs. Iceland

Cyprus vs. Andorra

Andorra vs. Iceland

Cyprus vs. Montenegro

Group D

Greece vs. Kosovo

Estonia vs. Liechtenstein

Greece vs. Liechtenstein

Estonia vs. Kosovo

Estonia vs. Greece

Kosovo vs. Liechtenstein

Play-offs

Promotional

Moldova vs. Estonia

Ireland vs. Cyprus

5th–8th

Malta vs. Greece

Macedonia vs. Montenegro

9th–12th

San Marino vs. Liechtenstein

Armenia vs. Andorra

13th–15th

Albania vs. Iceland

References

External links
Official Website

Americas Zone Group III
Davis Cup Europe/Africa Zone